The Candlemaker may refer to:

 a candlemaker
 The Candlemaker (film), a 1957 animated short film